Silvercrest may refer to:
 Lidl brand Silvercrest
Safran Silvercrest turbofan engine
Alvis Silver Crest car